Bruno Marques Menezes (born March 20, 1984 in Santos, São Paulo, Brazil) is a Brazilian footballer who last played for Cuiabá Esporte Clube. He formerly played with Major League Soccer side Chicago Fire. He is primarily utilized on the right side.

Menezes has spent his first five years as a professional in the Campeonato Paulista. He began his youth career with local club Mogi Mirim. Upon turning professional with that club, Menezes played first team football for the next three years, leaving the club in 2005 for another São Paulo club: União São João. After a season with the Macaws, he then joined São Carlos where he again played first-team football.

After an already lengthy career in his home country, Menezes opted for the United States, signing for the Chicago Fire in Major League Soccer on June 30, 2007. He was upgraded from the developmental to the senior roster early in the 2008 season, but was waived on May 7.

References

External links
Chicago Fire news
OurSportsCentral.com release
NBC5.com sports

1984 births
Living people
Brazilian footballers
Brazilian expatriate footballers
Mogi Mirim Esporte Clube players
União São João Esporte Clube players
São Carlos Futebol Clube players
Chicago Fire FC players
Miami FC (2006) players
Expatriate soccer players in the United States
Association football midfielders
Major League Soccer players